Saint-Maur is a commune in the Indre department in central France. On 1 January 2016, the former commune of Villers-les-Ormes was merged into Saint-Maur.

Population

See also
Communes of the Indre department

References

Communes of Indre